Eero Elo (born April 26, 1990) is a Finnish professional ice hockey player. He is currently playing for HC Thurgau of the Swiss League (SL). Elo was selected by the Minnesota Wild in the 5th round (145th overall) of the 2008 NHL Entry Draft.

Elo made his SM-liiga debut playing with Lukko during the 2009–10 SM-liiga season.

References

External links

1990 births
Living people
Ässät players
Avtomobilist Yekaterinburg players
Finnish ice hockey left wingers
KooKoo players
SC Langenthal players
Lukko players
Minnesota Wild draft picks
SCL Tigers players
HC Sibir Novosibirsk players
Vaasan Sport players
People from Rauma, Finland
Sportspeople from Satakunta